In mathematical logic, positive set theory is the name for a class of alternative set theories in which the axiom of comprehension holds for at least the positive formulas  (the smallest class of formulas containing atomic membership and equality formulas and closed under conjunction, disjunction, existential and universal quantification).

Typically, the motivation for these theories is topological:  the sets are the classes which are closed under a certain topology.  The closure conditions for the various constructions allowed in building positive formulas are readily motivated (and one can further justify the use of universal quantifiers bounded in sets to get generalized positive comprehension):  the justification of the existential quantifier seems to require that the topology be compact.

Axioms 

The set theory  of Olivier Esser consists of the following axioms:

Extensionality

Positive comprehension 

where  is a positive formula. A positive formula uses only the logical constants  but not .

Closure 

where  is a formula. That is, for every formula , the intersection of all sets which contain every  such that  exists. This can be put more briefly if class language is allowed (any condition on sets defining a class as in NBG):  for any class C there is a set which is the intersection of all sets which contain C as a subclass. This is a reasonable principle if the sets are understood as closed classes in a topology.

Infinity 

The von Neumann ordinal  exists.  This is not an axiom of infinity in the usual sense; if Infinity does not hold, the closure of  exists and has itself as its sole additional member (it is certainly infinite); the point of this axiom is that  contains no additional elements at all, which boosts the theory from the strength of second order arithmetic to the strength of Morse–Kelley set theory with the proper class ordinal a weakly compact cardinal.

Interesting properties 

 The universal set is a proper set in this theory.
 The sets of this theory are the collections of sets which are closed under a certain topology on the classes.
 The theory can interpret ZFC (by restricting oneself to the class of well-founded sets, which is not itself a set).  It in fact interprets a stronger theory (Morse–Kelley set theory with the proper class ordinal a weakly compact cardinal).

Researchers 

 Isaac Malitz originally introduced Positive Set Theory in his 1976 PhD Thesis at UCLA
 Alonzo Church was the chairman of the committee supervising the aforementioned thesis
 Olivier Esser seems to be the most active in this field.

See also 
 New Foundations by Quine

References

Systems of set theory